Highway 368 is a highway in the Canadian province of Saskatchewan. It runs from Highway 5 near Muenster to Highway 3 near Beatty.

Highway 368 intersects Highway 756, Highway 777, Highway 776, and Highway 41. Highway 368 passes near Lake Lenore, St. Brieux, Pathlow, and Claggett.

It was voted the worst highway in Saskatchewan in the Spring 2006.

Maintenance
 around Lake Lenore will be graded in 2008.  2009 will see another  section upgraded to gravel highway status.  Over the next two years the section between Lake Lenore and St. Brieux will have paved access.  There will be primary weight truck haul route available for nine months of the year. The Ministry of Highways and Infrastructure will contribute $14 million and the partnership will offer $300,000 in services and products.  The partnership in this region comprises ners providing about $300,000 in materials and services. Members of the partnership include the Lake Lenore, St. Brieux, St. Peter No. 369 Humboldt, Lake Lenore and Three Lakes, Bourgault Industries and the Lake Lenore Agro-Coop.  This is a portion of a program put forth by the provincial government called the Transportation for Economic Advantage.  This program comprises infrastructure upgrades over the next 10 years and $5 billion are being allotted towards this campaign.

Major intersections
From south to north:

References

368